Sharon Thompson-Schill is the Christopher H. Browne Distinguished Professor of Psychology at the University of Pennsylvania in Philadelphia, Pennsylvania. She is knowledgeable in the field of biological basis of human cognitive systems, including language, memory, perception, and cognitive control, and the relationships between these systems. As of 2023, she has produced more than 190 scientific publications, which collectively have been cited over 18,000 times.

Thompson-Schill practices in positions of leadership both at the University of Pennsylvania and in the broader scientific community. At the University of Pennsylvania, she recently served as the Chairperson of the Psychology Department (2014-2019), as the founding Director of MindCORE (2017-2019), and as the Director (2010-2014) and co-director (2014-2017) of the Center for Cognitive Neuroscience. She is also a member of the Committee on Science and the Arts at the Franklin Institute in Philadelphia and has served on the editorial boards of several scientific journals, including as Co-Editor-in-Chief of Cognitive Neuroscience.

Biographical Information

Thompson-Schill was born on June 24, 1970, in Washington D.C. She attended Stone Ridge School of the Sacred Heart in Maryland for high school, graduating in 1987. She currently lives in Philadelphia and has three children, who attended Central High School (Philadelphia) and Julia R. Masterman School (also in Philadelphia), and two of whom have attended Reed College, Pacific Northwest College of Art, Brandeis University, and Emerson College.

Thompson-Schill enrolled in Davidson College in 1987 and graduated in 1991 with a B.A. (with honors) in Psychology. She then pursued graduate study at Stanford University in Cognitive Psychology, receiving her Ph.D. in 1996. Her dissertation, entitled "Context effects on word recognition: Implications for models of lexical representation", was published and is currently available in the Stanford University Library. She spent the next three years as a post-doctoral fellow in the Psychology Department at the University of Pennsylvania before joining the faculty there in 1999.

Career 
Thompson-Schill's career is ongoing and well recognized. She was the Chairwoman of the Department of Psychology at the University of Pennsylvania from 2014 to 2019 and has served as the Director and co-director of the Center for Cognitive Neuroscience at the same university. She also served as the founding Director of MindCORE, the University of Pennsylvania's hub for the integrative study of the mind. She is a well-recognized professor at the university and has held numerous faculty appointments both there and at other institutions (such as Swarthmore College and Notre Dame of Maryland University). She is also a highly sought speaker, giving multiple keynote talks at scientific meetings and regular public presentations. She directs the Thompson-Schill Lab at the University of Pennsylvania, where she is active in research with her team.

Thompson-Schill has done extensive research on the biological basis of cognitive systems, including perception, language, and thought, resulting in numerous publications whose impact is reflected in their high citation rate in the scientific community. One particular focus of her lab's research has been the role of the brain's frontal lobes in the regulation of thought and behavior, including extensive studies of Cognitive control, part of the brain's executive system. Thompson-Schill has published numerous papers on the subject and spoke about it to the public at a panel discussion hosted by the American Folk Art Museum, entitled 'Unraveling the Mysteries of Creativity: Connections to Genetics, Mental Health, and the Brain'. Her work is primarily focused on cognitive processes and systems such as perception, language, and thought, and her team produces numerous studies and papers that are widely circulated throughout the psychological community. Another substantial focus of the Thompson-Schill Lab's research is conceptual knowledge, including how concepts are constructed, combined, and organized in the brain as well as how conceptual knowledge interacts with language and perception.

Her research uses a wide range of methods to study the biological basis of complex thought and behavior, including functional magnetic resonance imaging (fMRI), transcranial magnetic stimulation (TMS), and lesion-deficit mapping of neurological patients. For over 20 years, her research has been supported continuously by the National Institutes of Health, and she has received funding from a variety of other sources, including the National Science Foundation.

Her research has been published in well-reputed scientific journals, including the Proceedings of the National Academy of Sciences, Journal of Experimental Psychology: General, Cerebral Cortex, Cognition, and Nature Human Behaviour.

Awards

Thompson-Schill has been recognized with numerous awards and honors, both for her innovations in research and for her outstanding mentorship and teaching of students. Her research awards include a Young Investigator Award from the Cognitive Neuroscience Society, a Mid-Career Award from the Psychonomic Society, election as a Fellow of the Society of Experimental Psychologists, and election as a Fellow of the Cognitive Science Society. Her teaching and mentoring awards include the Professional Opportunities for Women in Research and Education Award from the National Science Foundation (1999), the Women in Cognitive Science Mentorship Award (2004), the Lindback Award for Distinguished Teaching (2006), the Biological Basis of Behavior Society's Professor of the Year Award (2008), the Trustees’ Council of Penn Women Award for Advising (2016), and the Provost's Award for Distinguished Ph.D. Teaching and Mentoring (2018).

Across her career, Thompson-Schill has also been awarded substantial funding for her research program, including continuous support from the National Institutes of Health (NIH) since 2000. As of 2019, three major grants are currently active and twenty-five are concluded.

In 2021, Thompson-Schill was named Philadelphia's Biggest Foodie by the Delicious City podcast.

Selected works 

 Leshinskaya, A & Thompson-Schill, S.L. (2019). From the structure of experience to concepts of structure: How the concept "cause" is attributed to objects and events. Journal of Experimental Psychology: General, 148, 619–643.
Coutanche, M.N. & Thompson-Schill, S.L. (2019). Neural activity in human visual cortex is transformed by learning real world size. NeuroImage, 186, 570–576.
Medaglia, J. D., Huang, W., Karuza, E. A., Kelkar, A., Thompson-Schill, S. L., Ribeiro, A., & Bassett, D. S. (2018). Functional alignment with anatomical networks is associated with cognitive flexibility. Nature Human Behaviour, 2, 156–164.
Chrysikou, E. G., Casasanto, D., & Thompson-Schill, S. L. (2017). Motor experience influences object knowledge. Journal of Experimental Psychology: General, 146(3), 395. 
Yee, E. & Thompson-Schill, S.L. (2016). Putting concepts into context. Psychonomic Bulletin and Review, 23(4), 1015–1027. 
Matheson, H. E., Buxbaum, L.J., & Thompson-Schill, S. L. (2017). Differential tuning of ventral and dorsal streams during the generation of common and uncommon tool uses. Journal of Cognitive Neuroscience, 29, 1791–1802.
 Coutanche, M.N., Solomon, S.H., & Thompson-Schill, S.L. (2016). A meta-analysis of fMRI decoding: Quantifying influences on human visual population codes. Neuropsychologia, 82, 134–141.
Coutanche, M. N., & Thompson-Schill, S. L. (2015). Rapid consolidation of new knowledge in adulthood via fast mapping. Trends in Cognitive Sciences, 19(9), 486–488.
Musz, E., & Thompson-Schill, S. L. (2015). Semantic variability predicts neural variability of object concepts. Neuropsychologia, 76, 41–51.
Coutanche, M. N., & Thompson-Schill, S. L. (2014). Creating concepts from converging features in human cortex. Cerebral Cortex, 25(9), 2584–2593.
Coutanche, M. N. & Thompson-Schill, S. L. (2013). Information Connectivity: Identifying synchronized discriminability of multi-voxel patterns across the brain. Frontiers in Human Neuroscience, 7, 15. 
Lupyan, G., Mirman, D., Hamilton, R., & Thompson-Schill, S. L. (2012). Categorization is modulated by transcranial direct current stimulation over left prefrontal cortex. Cognition, 124, 36–49.
Thompson-Schill, S. L., Ramscar, M., & Chrysikou, E. G. (2009). Cognition without control: When a little frontal cortex goes a long way. Current Directions in Psychological Science, 18, 259–263.
Thompson-Schill, S. L., Swick, D., Farah, M. J., D'Esposito, M., Kan, I. P., & Knight, R. T. (1998).  Verb generation in patients with focal frontal lesions: A neuropsychological test of neuroimaging findings. Proceedings of the National Academy of Sciences, 95, 15855–15860.  
Thompson-Schill, S. L., D’Esposito, M., Aguirre, G. K., & Farah, M. J. (1997). Role of left inferior prefrontal cortex in retrieval of semantic knowledge: a reevaluation. Proceedings of the National Academy of Sciences, 94(26), 14792–14797.

References

External links
 Thompson-Schill Lab

American women psychologists
20th-century American psychologists
21st-century American psychologists
University of Pennsylvania faculty
Davidson College alumni
Stanford University alumni
Living people
American women academics
21st-century American women
Christopher H. Browne Distinguished Professor
1970 births